The first HMS Whirlwind  was a W-class destroyer of the British Royal Navy that saw service during World War I and World War II.

Whirlwind was built by Swan Hunter and was launched on 15 December 1917. In September 1939 was part of the 11th Destroyer Flotilla. On 5 July 1940, she was sunk by the  under the command of Wilhelm Rollmann in the North Atlantic Ocean southwest of Ireland.

Notes

Bibliography
 
 
 
 
 
 
 
 
 
 
 
 
 
 

 

V and W-class destroyers of the Royal Navy
1917 ships
World War I destroyers of the United Kingdom
World War II destroyers of the United Kingdom
Ships sunk by German submarines in World War II
World War II shipwrecks in the Atlantic Ocean
Maritime incidents in July 1940
Ships built by Swan Hunter